The Smith Mine disaster was the worst coal mining disaster in the U.S. state of Montana, and the 43rd worst in the United States, according to the National Institute for Occupational Safety and Health (NIOSH).

On February 27, 1943, at approximately 9:37 a.m., an explosion ripped through Smith Mine No. 3, a coal mine located between the towns of Bearcreek and Washoe. Since it was a Saturday, there was a short crew in the mine. Of the 77 men working that day, only three got out of the mine alive, and one of the rescue workers died soon afterward. The report from the United States Bureau of Mines states that 30 of the men were killed instantly by the explosion, and the remainder died either because of injuries sustained in the explosion, or because of suffocation from the carbon monoxide and methane gas in the mine. The explosion was deep underground, and was not heard at the mouth of the mine, despite having enough power to knock a 20-ton locomotive off its tracks 0.25 mile (0.4 km) from the blast origin.

All of the bodies were removed from the mine. There is a highway plaque near the mouth of the mine, which was never reopened, and there are memorials in the cemeteries in Bearcreek and nearby Red Lodge, the county seat for Carbon County.

The explosion was attributed to a build-up of methane gas in the mine. The cause of detonation is unknown, but various reports note that men were allowed to smoke in the mine, and that fuses for blasting were lit with matches.

The site of the disaster is included in the Smith Mine Historic District, listed on the National Register of Historic Places in 2009.

See also
 Argonaut Mine
 Monongah mining disaster
 Coal mining disasters in United States
 Treadwell Gold Mine

References 

1943 disasters in the United States
1943 in Montana
Carbon County, Montana
Coal mining disasters in Montana
1943 mining disasters